The 13th season of the television series Arthur was originally broadcast on PBS in the United States from October 12, 2009 to April 9, 2010 and contains 10 episodes. All episodes from this season aired on several countries outside the U.S., such as CBBC in United Kingdom and TVOKids in Canada, prior to their U.S. air dates.

Episodes

Production
Episodes from this season were produced together with season 12. As a result, the episodes from this season were aired on several countries such as Canada, United Kingdom, and Australia, prior to the U.S.

One of the most notable episodes, "The Great MacGrady" (co-sponsored by the Lance Armstrong Foundation) deals with the topic issue of cancer (a topic that had only been addressed once in an animated series). Executive producer Jacqui Deegan comments on the WGBH press release: 

The episode premiered during the week-long programming block A Very Special Arthur. The episode's ending features a dedication to Leah Ryan, a former Arthur writer who died from leukemia on June 12, 2008. The character of Mrs. MacGrady was renamed Leah MacGrady in Ryan's honor. 

"No Acting, Please / Prunella and the Disappointing Ending" is listed as the fifth episode of this season on PBS's official episode guide and "The Great MacGrady" as the first, although they are flipped in order according to original U.S. airdate.

Celebrity guests
Philip Seymour Hoffman guest starred as himself on the episode "No Acting, Please".

Lance Armstrong guest starred as himself — for the second time on the series — on the episode "The Great MacGrady".

Promotion
A book version of the episode has been released on the PBS Kids website in English and Spanish before its airing date, along with information about cancer.

The Lance Armstrong Foundation Headquarters and WGBH Boston Studios have shown pre-screenings of "The Great MacGrady" a week before its television premiere. In addition to viewing the episode, children had the opportunity to participate in activities in response to the contents of the episode. WITF Public Media Center also held a pre-screening event  along with several other public libraries.

A Very Special Arthur
"The Great MacGrady" was aired on October 19, 2009 at Arthur'''s regular time. This programming block was promoted as A Very Special Arthur. A promotional video was shown the week before the programming block in between Arthur and other PBS Kids GO! television programs.

The decision for A Very Special Arthur'' was made by PBS and the Lance Armstrong Foundation. Their goal was to make the episode as accessible as possible to children, families, and educators so they would have the tools to discuss about the heavily impacting topic.

References

General references 
 
 
 
 

2009 American television seasons
2010 American television seasons
Arthur (TV series) seasons
2009 Canadian television seasons
2010 Canadian television seasons